Kierrie Johnson (born August 4, 1988) is a former Canadian football wide receiver. He played for the BC Lions, Saskatchewan Roughriders, Ottawa Redblacks and Toronto Argonauts of the Canadian Football League. He played college football for the Houston Cougars.

Professional career

BC Lions
Johnson signed as a free agent with the BC Lions on May 26, 2011.
Johnson was released by the Lions on October 25, 2012.

Saskatchewan Roughriders
Johnson signed with the Saskatchewan Roughriders on November 10, 2012.

Ottawa Redblacks
After two seasons with the Roughriders, Johnson signed with the Ottawa Redblacks on February 18, 2014. Johnson only played in Ottawa's first four games of the season before spending the rest of the season on injured reserve. During those four games, he was the team's leading receiver, amassing 214 yards on 17 receptions. He was released on April 23, 2015.

Toronto Argonauts
On May 6, 2015, Johnson signed with the Toronto Argonauts.

References

External links
Toronto Argonauts bio
Ottawa Redblacks bio

1988 births
Living people
African-American players of Canadian football
American players of Canadian football
BC Lions players
Canadian football wide receivers
Ottawa Redblacks players
Saskatchewan Roughriders players
Players of Canadian football from Houston
Houston Cougars football players
21st-century African-American sportspeople
20th-century African-American people